Araeosoma fenestratum is a species of sea urchin of the family Echinothuriidae. Their armour is covered with spines. It is placed in the genus Araeosoma and lives in the sea. Araeosoma fenestratum was first scientifically described in 1872 by Thomson.

See also 
 Araeosoma coriaceum
 Araeosoma eurypatum
 Araeosoma leptaleum

References 

fenestratum
Animals described in 1872